IF Elfsborg had another decent season, finishing in third of Allsvenskan, and having a decent run in the UEFA Europa League, knocking Braga out, before losing to Lazio prior to the group stage. Having been tipped for domestic glory, heavy defeats to IFK Göteborg and Malmö FF within a couple of weeks meant the team got to far behind to mount a serious challenge.

Squad

Goalkeepers
  Ante Čović
  Joakim Wulff

Defenders
  Mathias Florén
  Johan Karlsson
  Martin Andersson
  Anders Wikström
  Teddy Lučić
  Daniel Mobaeck

Midfielders
  Helgi Daníelsson
  Jari Ilola
  Anders Svensson
  Martin Ericsson
  Jesper Florén
  Daniel Nordmark
  Emir Bajrami
  Niklas Hult
  Stefan Ishizaki

Attackers
  Denni Avdić
  Amadou Jawo
  James Keene
  Joel Johansson
  Henrik Svedberg

Allsvenskan

Matches

 Elfsborg-Hammarby 1-1
 0-1 Erik Johansson 
 1-1 Stefan Ishizaki 
 Örebro-Elfsborg 0-1
 0-1 Joel Johansson 
 Elfsborg-Kalmar FF 1-1
 1-0 Emir Bajrami 
 1-1 Daniel Mendes 
 Gefle-Elfsborg 1-2
 1-0 Hasse Berggren 
 1-1 Mathias Florén 
 1-2 Anders Svensson 
 Elfsborg-Malmö FF 1-0
 1-0 Mathias Florén 
 Brommapojkarna-Elfsborg 1-1
 1-0 Olof Guterstam 
 1-1 James Keene 
 Elfsborg-IFK Göteborg 2-0
 1-0 Daniel Mobaeck 
 2-0 Emir Bajrami 
 GAIS-Elfsborg 1-1
 0-1 Anders Svensson 
 1-1 Mattias Lindström 
 Elfsborg-Halmstad 4-0
 1-0 Daniel Nordmark 
 2-0 James Keene 
 3-0 James Keene 
 4-0 Denni Avdić 
 AIK-Elfsborg 0-0
 Elfsborg-Trelleborg 1-0
 1-0 Daniel Nordmark 
 Häcken-Elfsborg 1-1
 1-0 Mathias Ranégie 
 1-1 Martin Ericsson 
 Elfsborg-Örgryte 3-0
 1-0 Stefan Ishizaki 
 2-0 James Keene 
 3-0 Emir Bajrami 
 Helsingborg-Elfsborg 3-2
 1-0 Christoffer Andersson 
 2-0 Rasmus Jönsson 
 2-1 Emir Bajrami 
 2-2 Emir Bajrami 
 3-2 Rasmus Jönsson 
 Djurgården-Elfsborg 1-2
 0-1 Emir Bajrami 
 1-1 Kebba Ceesay 
 1-2 Teddy Lučić 
 Elfsborg-Djurgården 3-1
 0-1 Daniel Sjölund 
 1-1 Denni Avdić 
 2-1 Daniel Nordmark 
 3-1 Petter Gustafsson 
 Kalmar FF-Elfsborg 3-1
 1-0 David Elm 
 1-1 Helgi Daníelsson 
 2-1 Rasmus Elm 
 3-1 Abiola Dauda 
 Elfsborg-Gefle 2-3
 1-0 Stefan Ishizaki 
 1-1 Yannick Bapupa 
 1-2 Yannick Bapupa 
 1-3 Jonas Lantto 
 2-3 Stefan Ishizaki 
 Hammarby-Elfsborg 2-3
 0-1 Stefan Ishizaki 
 1-1 Andreas Dahl 
 1-2 Anders Svensson 
 1-3 Stefan Ishizaki 
 2-3 Rafael 
 Elfsborg-Örebro 2-1
 1-0 Daniel Mobaeck 
 2-0 James Keene 
 2-1 Mikael Astvald 
 IFK Göteborg-Elfsborg 4-0
 1-0 Hjálmar Jónsson 
 2-0 Hannes Stiller 
 3-0 Hannes Stiller 
 4-0 Tobias Hysén 
 Elfsborg-GAIS 2-2
 1-0 Anders Svensson 
 1-1 Wanderson 
 2-1 Amadou Jawo 
 2-2 Eyjólfur Héðinsson 
 Malmö FF-Elfsborg 5-0
 1-0 Daniel Larsson 
 2-0 Guillermo Molins 
 3-0 Edward Ofere 
 4-0 Edward Ofere 
 5-0 Daniel Larsson 
 Elfsborg-Brommapojkarna 1-0
 1-0 James Keene 
 Halmstad-Elfsborg 1-2
 0-1 Martin Ericsson 
 1-1 Azrack Mahamat 
 1-2 Denni Avdić 
 Elfsborg-AIK 0-0
 Trelleborg-Elfsborg 0-1
 0-1 Martin Ericsson 
 Elfsborg-Häcken 1-1
 1-0 Mattias Östberg 
 1-1 Marcus Jarlegren 
 Örgryte-Elfsborg 1-1
 0-1 James Keene 
 1-1 Pavel Zavadil 
 Elfsborg-Helsingborg 1-0
 1-0 James Keene

Topscorers
  James Keene 8
  Stefan Ishizaki 6
  Emir Bajrami 6
  Martin Ericsson 4
  Anders Svensson 4
  Denni Avdić 3
  Daniel Nordmark 3

Sources
- Soccerway - IF Elfsborg matches

IF Elfsborg seasons
Elfsborg